The 2014 Asia-Pacific Rally Championship season was an international rally championship sanctioned by the FIA. The championship was contested by a combination of regulations with Group N competing directly against Super 2000 cars for points.

The championship began in New Zealand on 11 April and concluded in China on 9 November. The Asia Cup sub-championship had been due to continue to a 7 December finish in Thailand, but this event was cancelled. The championship was held over six events with a candidate event included as part of the Asia Cup. A second candidate event in India was scheduled to be held in India but proximity of local parliamentary elections restricted the event's ability to upgrade competitive stages within the timeframe allowed by the early season. The rally was rescheduled until the end of the local season and its APRC status removed.

The championship was won by European champion Jan Kopecký driving a Team MRF prepared Škoda Fabia. Kopecký wrapped up the championship early after his victory at Rally Hokkaido, the third of his four victories in the six-event season. Defending champion Gaurav Gill won the other two rallies and held second in the championship until the final rally. Two late season failures allowed him to be overtaken by New Zealand Proton driver Michael Young. Škoda won the manufacturers championship from Mitsubishi. Team MRF – with drivers Kopecký and Gill – won all six rallies, winning the teams title from Japanese Subaru team Cusco Racing.

Kopecký won the Pacific Cup in dominant fashion with almost double the points of his nearest competitors. Young and Australian Mitsubishi driver Mark Pedder tied for second, with Young being awarded the runners up position on countback.

Japanese Subaru driver Yuya Sumiyama won the Asia Cup, finishing 50 points clear of Sri Lankan Subaru driver Dinesh Deheragoda. Gill faded to fourth in the Asia Cup after failing to finish at Rally Hokkaido and Rally China Longyou.

Selected entries

Event calendar and results

The 2014 APRC was as follows:

Championship standings
The 2014 APRC for Drivers points was as follows:

Note: 1 – 12 refers to the bonus points awarded for each leg of the rally for the first five place getters, 1st (7), 2nd (5), 3rd (3), 4th (2), 5th (1). There were two bonus legs for each rally.

Pacific Cup

Asia Cup

References

External links

APRC Live Podcast
APRC News and Video

Asia-Pacific Rally Championship seasons
Asia-Pacific
Asia-Pacific
Asia-Pacific